Dorothy Onesphoro Gwajima also known Gwajima Dorothy is a Tanzanian CCM politician and a nominated cabinet member since 2020. She was appointed by President John Magufuli into the Magufuli cabinet as the Minister of Health, Community Development, Gender, Elders and Children. She continued in this role following the death of John Magufuli, however, in January 2022 the ministry was split and she became the new Minister of Community Development and Gender.

She became widely known after announcing that Tanzania did not plan to order any Covid-19 vaccines and promoting steam inhalation as a cure against the virus, along with a vegetable smoothie recipe and other cures, in line with President Magufuli's claims.

References

Living people
1971 births
Tanzanian women
Tanzanian scientists
Government ministers of Tanzania
Chama Cha Mapinduzi MPs
Chama Cha Mapinduzi politicians
Nominated Tanzanian MPs
Tanzanian MPs 2020–2025